Mike Yard is an American stand-up comedian. Yard was a contributor for The Nightly Show with Larry Wilmore.  Yard was previously the winner of Comedy Central's Get Up, Stand Up comedy competition. He has also appeared on Inside Amy Schumer and The Break with Michelle Wolf.

Career
Yard was born on Saint Croix in the United States Virgin Islands and raised in Frederiksted. When he was 13 he moved with his family to Brooklyn's East New York neighborhood.  He studied computer programming at Hunter College, and later worked briefly as a union representative, involved in organizing a strike at the Museum of Modern Art, before first trying standup comedy when he was 24. He became a well-known presence in the New York comedy circuit, touring actively and appearing on ComicView, Def Comedy Jam and Comedy at the Apollo.

On The Nightly Show, he became known as one of the show's leading contributors, serving as a comic "foil" to host Larry Wilmore, and for his role in political skits such as his portrayal of a talking gun named "Hand Gun" and his recurring "Y Files" segments parodying conspiracy theories.  He also has his own podcast called Yard Talk.

In 2018, Yard joined the cast of American Public Media's radio program Live From Here.

Personal life
In 2008 he married plus-size model and actress Mia Amber Davis, who died of a blood clot after knee surgery in 2011.

References

External links

Official website

Living people
People from Saint Croix, U.S. Virgin Islands
American stand-up comedians
African-American television personalities
21st-century African-American people
Year of birth missing (living people)